Fischerbach is a town in the district of Ortenau in Baden-Württemberg in Germany.

History

The town was first registered in 1139. The village was part of the Gengenbach monastery and the "Herren von Wolfach" (a noble family first registered in 1084) and later became part of the Fürstenberg shire. In 1806, Fischerbach became part of Baden, and since 1973, Fischerbach has been part of the district of Ortenau. Administratively Fischerbach is autonomous.

Education

Fischerbach has a kindergarten and elementary as well as a secondary school.

References

Towns in Baden-Württemberg
Ortenaukreis